Melhania rotundata is a plant in the family Malvaceae, native to East Africa.

Description
The round to ovate leaves are tomentose, coloured greyish-green. The flowers have bright yellow petals.

Distribution and habitat
Melhania rotundata is native to Ethiopia, Kenya, Somalia and Tanzania.

References

rotundata
Flora of Ethiopia
Flora of Kenya
Flora of Somalia
Flora of Tanzania
Plants described in 1868